Halifax is a constituency represented in the House of Commons of the UK Parliament since 2015 by Holly Lynch of the Labour Party.

Boundaries 

1918–1983: The County Borough of Halifax.

1983–2010: The Metropolitan Borough of Calderdale wards of Illingworth, Mixenden, Northowram and Shelf, Ovenden, St John's, Skircoat, Sowerby Bridge, Town, and Warley.

2010–present: The Metropolitan Borough of Calderdale wards of Illingworth and Mixenden, Northowram and Shelf, Ovenden, Park, Skircoat, Sowerby Bridge, Town, and Warley.

This constituency covers the large town of Halifax in West Yorkshire and includes the smaller town of Sowerby Bridge which adjoins Halifax but until 1974 was a separate Urban District.

History
The parliamentary borough was granted in the Great Reform Act 1832 and returned from that year until 1918 two members. A county borough recognized the density of the developed area in 1888 which provided most functions for inhabitants, retaining the West Yorkshire ceremonial county.

At the time of the Norman Conquest, Halifax formed part of the extensive manor of Wakefield, which belonged to the king, but in the 13th century was in the hands of John Earl de Warrenne aka. Earl of Surrey (1231–1304). The prosperity of the town began with the first woollen products workshop established here in 1414, when there are said to have been only thirteen houses, which before the end of the 16th century had increased to 520. Camden, about the end of the 17th century, wrote that "the people are very industrious, so that though the soil about it be barren and improfitable, not fit to live on, they have so flourished ... by the clothing trade that they are very rich and have gained a reputation for it above their neighbours." The manufacturing standards and trade were improved by the arrival of certain merchants and clothworkers driven from the Spanish Netherlands by the persecution by the Duke of Alva.

Halifax was a borough by prescription rather than a medieval parliamentary borough, its privileges growing up with the increased prosperity brought by the cloth trade, but it was not incorporated until 1848. From 1832 until 1918 the town's property-qualifying residents paying scot and lot returned two members to parliament.

Constituency profile
As of 2001, the town in the Pennines was relatively affluent, not afflicted by the high levels of unemployment, underemployment and crime seen in a few wards of the Yorkshire and Humber region but most constituents had modest incomes and there was some social housing in certain wards. Since 1987 the MP has represented the Labour Party; before that date for four years it was held by a Conservative MP, but generally since the Second World War it has been a Labour seat.

Prior to the 2017 general election, the Conservative Party launched its election manifesto at Dean Clough Mill in Halifax, and targeted the seat fairly heavily, for two years earlier the Labour majority in the constituency had fallen to just 428 votes, or 1% of the total vote. However, Lynch increased her majority by almost 5,000 votes, giving Labour its biggest majority in Halifax since 2001.

Members of Parliament

MPs 1832–1918

MPs since 1918
Representation reduced to one member, 1918

Elections

Elections in the 2010s

Elections in the 2000s

Elections in the 1990s

Elections in the 1980s

Elections in the 1970s

Elections in the 1960s

Elections in the 1950s 

Blackburn was a vice-president of the Bradford Conservative Association. He was nominated after the Conservative and Liberal associations in the division had failed to reach agreement on the proposal for a joint anti-Labour candidate.

Elections in the 1940s

Elections in the 1930s

Elections in the 1920s

Elections in the 1910s

Elections in the 1900s

Elections in the 1890s

 Caused by Shaw's resignation.

 Caused by Shaw's death

Elections in the 1880s

 Caused by Stansfeld's appointment as President of the Local Government Board.

 Caused by Hutchinson's resignation.

Elections in the 1870s

 
 

 Caused by Crossley's resignation.

 

 

 

 Caused by Crossley's appointment as President of the Poor Law Board.

Elections in the 1860s

 Caused by Stansfeld's appointment as a Lord Commissioner of the Treasury.

 
 

 Caused by Stansfeld's appointment as Civil Lord of the Admiralty.

Elections in the 1850s

 Caused by Wood's appointment as Secretary of State for India.

 

 

 

 Caused by Wood's appointment as First Lord of the Admiralty

 

 

 Caused by Wood's appointment as President of the Board of Control.

Elections in the 1840s

 
 

 

 Caused by Wood's appointment as Chancellor of the Exchequer

Elections in the 1830s

See also 
 List of parliamentary constituencies in West Yorkshire

Notes

References

Sources
 Victoria County History, Yorkshire
 T. Wright, The Antiquities of the Town of Halifax (Leeds, 1738)
 John Watson, The History and Antiquities of the Parish of Halifax (London, 1775)
 John Crabtree, A Concise History of the Parish and Vicarage of Halifax (Halifax and London, 1836).
 

Parliamentary constituencies in Yorkshire and the Humber
Constituencies of the Parliament of the United Kingdom established in 1832
Politics of Calderdale
Halifax, West Yorkshire